Szilveszter Fekete (born 1955) is a Hungarian water polo coach. He was the head coach of the Great Britain women's national water polo team at the 2012 Summer Olympics.

References

External links
 

1955 births
Living people
Hungarian male water polo players
Hungarian water polo coaches
Great Britain women's national water polo team coaches
Water polo coaches at the 2012 Summer Olympics